The Center for Christian-Democratic Studies, (Serbian: Центар за хришћанско-демократске студије / Centar za hrišćansko-demokratske studije) formerly known as the Serbian Christian Democratic Movement  is a non-governmental organization in the Republic of Serbia. It was founded in 2010. According to its Statute the organization  promotes a Christian Democracy, Social market economy and Family values.

The Association is an associate member of the European Christian Political Movement  (ECPM).

See also 

 Christian Democracy

External links
 The Center for Christian-Democratic Studies - official website

References

Political organizations based in Serbia
Christian democracy in Europe
Organizations established in 2010
2010 establishments in Serbia